Ingrid Ellen Michaelson (born December 8, 1979) is an American singer-songwriter and actress. Her first album, Slow the Rain, was released in 2005, and she has since released eight more albums: Girls and Boys, Be OK, Everybody, Human Again, Lights Out, It Doesn't Have to Make Sense, Songs for the Season, and her most recent, Stranger Songs. Her two highest-charting singles are "The Way I Am" (2007) and "Girls Chase Boys" (2014), at #37 and #52 on the Billboard Hot 100, respectively.

Early life
Michaelson is half Swedish and was born in 1979 in New York City to artistic parents. Her father, Carl Michaelson, was a manager of copyrights for the publishing company Carl Fischer Music and a composer on the side ("The Praise of Christmas"). Her mother, Elizabeth Egbert, was a sculptor, of Dutch ancestry. As a child, Michaelson performed in a musical theatre group called Staten Island Kids On Stage. She took up piano at age 4, and trained until age seven at Manhattan's Third Street Music School, continuing for many more years at the Jewish Community Center of Staten Island's Dorothy Delson Kuhn Music Institute. While there she met vocal coach Elizabeth McCullough, who worked with her through high school. Michaelson is a graduate of Staten Island Technical High School and Binghamton University, where she received a degree in theater. While at Binghamton University, she was a member of the Binghamtonics, a co-ed a cappella group, as well as the Pappy Parker Players, an improv comedy group, and the theatre repertory company under Sue Peters. Her time at Binghamton is mentioned in her song "The Hat."

Musical career

2006–08: Girls and Boys
In 2006, Michaelson independently released her second album, Girls and Boys. The album, like her previous music, was streamed on Myspace. A music producer from the ABC drama Grey's Anatomy found her music online. After being contacted by the music producer, Michaelson began to be approached by several record companies. Wanting to retain all of the rights she had as an independent artist, Michaelson developed a deal with Original Signal Recordings, acting as the marketing and distribution arm for Michaelson's label. Through Original Signal, Michaelson re-released Girls and Boys into mainstream marketing on September 18, 2007. It peaked at #63 on the Billboard charts and received positive reviews from critics. Additionally, in 2007, "The Way I Am", a song from the album, was featured in an Old Navy commercial. The 30-second ad played on the major US networks and most prime-time shows for a few days. In less than 3 weeks, more than 65 appearances in prime-time had been made, including 17 season premieres.

2008–10: Be OK and Everybody

In 2008, Michaelson released her third album, and first compilation album, Be OK. The album debuted at #35 on the Billboard charts and received mixed to positive reviews. The album features the single "Be OK", which received a large amount of exposure on several shows and commercials. Michaelson joined the Hotel Cafe Tour that fall in support of the album, whose proceeds went toward cancer research. In 2009, Michaelson released her fourth album, Everybody. Everybody debuted on #18 on the Billboard charts and received positive reviews. It features the single "Maybe", which received positive reviews and was featured on several television programs. Her show in Sydney, Australia, at the Metro Theater is available online at MoshCam, a website that shows pre-recorded concerts.

2010–12: Parachute and Human Again

In 2010, Michaelson digitally released the single "Parachute", a song that she wrote but was recorded by Cheryl Cole on Cole's album 3 Words. The song has not been featured on any albums, but is available on both iTunes and Amazon. In 2012, Michaelson released her fifth album, Human Again. Human Again debuted at #5 on the Billboard charts and received very positive reviews, with critics praising the album's unique sound. Michaelson's first tour leg for the album, The Human Again Tour, was sold out almost every night of the tour. After the first tour, Michaelson continued to tour on 3 other legs, two in North America, and one across the world. The first leg of Michaelson's tour was held from April to May. The second leg, The Human Again Summer Tour, was held from June to August. The Third Leg, The Human Again Fall Tour, began in September. Michaelson also played 3 shows in Australia, where Human Again was the first formally released record of hers.

In September 2012, she was featured in a campaign called "30 Songs / 30 Days" to support Half the Sky: Turning Oppression into Opportunity for Women Worldwide, a multi-platform media project inspired by Nicholas Kristof and Sheryl WuDunn's book.

2014–2015: Lights Out
On February 4, 2014, Michaelson released the lead single, "Girls Chase Boys", from her album Lights Out. The song reached #52 on the Billboard Hot 100. "Afterlife" and "Time Machine" were released as the second and third singles with moderate commercial success.

On April 25, 2014, Lights Out was released. The deluxe edition, which was released in November later that year, contains an additional six bonus tracks.

2016–2017: It Doesn't Have To Make Sense and Alter Egos

On April 29, 2016, Michaelson released the song "Hell No". It serves as the lead single from her seventh studio album, It Doesn't Have to Make Sense, which was released on August 26, 2016, through Cabin 24 Records. In July she released a second video of "Hell No," which incorporates members of the Deaf West theater company performing the lyrics in American Sign Language. In support of the album, Michaelson embarked on the "Hell No Tour" beginning October 6, 2016, in Cincinnati, OH.

On 12 May 2017, a 5-track EP titled Alter Egos was released. It consists of re-worked songs from It Doesn't Have to Make Sense with guest vocalists on each track.

In 2017, Michaelson contributed "Smallest Light" and "Stay Right Where You Are" to the soundtrack for the film The Space Between Us.

2018–present: Ingrid Michaelson's Songs for the Season and Stranger Songs
On 26 October 2018, Michaelson released a Christmas album called Ingrid Michaelson's Songs for the Season. In January 2019, Michaelson announced she was composing the score for a musical adaptation of The Notebook. On May 10, 2019, she released "Missing You", which serves as the lead single off of her ninth studio album, Stranger Songs. Michaelson first announced the album via her Twitter in January 2018, writing that it would be inspired by the Netflix series Stranger Things. The album was released on June 28, 2019.

In July 2020, Michaelson was nominated for her first Emmy Award in the Outstanding Original Music and Lyrics category for the song "Build it Up", written specifically for the finale of Hulu's hit miniseries Little Fires Everywhere.

Collaborations 

In 2006, Michaelson teamed up with William Fitzsimmons on his album Goodnight, which was released that same year.

Michaelson and her friend Sara Bareilles co-wrote "Winter Song" which was featured on The Hotel Café Presents Winter Songs, a compilation of both original recordings as well as classic holiday tracks sung by a lineup of female singer-songwriters. Michaelson performed "Winter Song" with Bareilles for President Obama and his family as well as many spectators at the National Christmas Tree Lighting in December 2010. In 2011, "Winter Song" reached #2 on the Irish Singles Chart.

Michaelson provided backup vocals on two songs from PlayRadioPlay!'s album Texas, including "I'm a Pirate, You're a Princess" and the title track, "Texas". She provided backup vocals on Greg Laswell's album, Take A Bow, which was released on May 4, 2010. Collaboration was done on the songs "Take Everything", "My Fight (For You)", and "Come Clean".

Michaelson's bandmate, Allie Moss released a 2009 EP, Passerby. Its song "Corner" was selected by British Telecommunications in the UK for their BT Infinity television commercials. Other past and present band members include Chris Kuffner (bass), Bess Rogers (guitar), Saul Simon MacWilliams (keys), Billy Libby (guitar), Sarab Singh (drums), and Elliot Jacobson (drums).

In 2010, Michaelson co-wrote the song "Parachute" with Marshall Altman which was covered by British singer Cheryl Cole on her debut solo album 3 Words; it peaked at #5 on the UK Singles Chart. Michaelson initially believed the track was "so poppy" that she could not release it herself. However, after the song was reworked by "Everybody" producer Dan Romer to make a more "interesting, funky production", Michaelson released the song as a personal single. There are two different music videos for the song.

Of the release of "Parachute" and upcoming material, Michaelson explained in a 2010 interview with Billboard.com, "I just felt like I wanted to put something out. I'm not ready to put a full album out, so we thought we'd put this out and see how people take it or don't take it." She said that she expects to release her next album, "probably in the middle of next year".

In 2012, Michaelson and Laswell co-wrote and sang the duet "Landline", which appeared on his album of the same name.

Her 2014 album, Lights Out, was a collaborative effort. "On all my previous records, I'd written all the songs myself. It was one producer and me locked in a room for months," she said. "Not that that was bad, but I think that everything has a season. I never wanted to kind of give up control. I think I'm letting go of a lot of things – embracing the idea of allowing people to help me in all facets of my life. I think that I was a bit of a control freak, and I'm just more open to letting people be part of things that they weren't part of before. It's liberating. I had the best time ever on the last record. It was just really wonderful to be able to share the success with other people." Michaelson has also appeared on The Nerdist Podcast with Chris Hardwick.

In 2021, Ingrid Michaelson collaborated with British-Pakistani singer Zayn Malik on the single "To Begin Again". The song was released on March 17, 2021.

Broadway 
Michaelson played the role of Sonya Rostova temporarily in the Broadway musical Natasha, Pierre & The Great Comet of 1812 from July 3 to August 13, 2017, while actress Brittain Ashford was on leave.

In January 2019, it was reported that Michaelson was writing the music and lyrics for a musical adaptation of The Notebook.

Film 
Michaelson made her film debut in the comedy film Humor Me, which was released January 12, 2018.

Personal life

Michaelson married fellow musician Greg Laswell in 2011. They divorced in 2015.

In late 2015, Michaelson announced her relationship with film and stage actor Will Chase.

Michaelson identifies as a feminist.

Discography

 Slow the Rain (2005)
 Girls and Boys (2006)
 Be OK (2008)
 Everybody (2009)
 Human Again (2012)
 Lights Out (2014)
 It Doesn't Have to Make Sense (2016)
Songs for the Season (2018)
Stranger Songs (2019)

References

External links

 
 

1979 births
Living people
21st-century American guitarists
21st-century American pianists
21st-century American singers
21st-century American women guitarists
21st-century American women pianists
21st-century American women singers
American feminists
American folk musicians
American folk-pop singers
American people of Dutch descent
American people of Swedish descent
American sopranos
American ukulele players
American women singer-songwriters
Binghamton University alumni
Feminist musicians
Guitarists from New York City
Indie folk musicians
Mom + Pop Music artists
People from Staten Island
Singer-songwriters from New York (state)
Singers from New York City
Universal Motown Records artists